Skovorodino is the name of several inhabited localities in Russia.

Urban localities
Skovorodino, Amur Oblast, a town in Skovorodinsky District of Amur Oblast

Rural localities
Skovorodino, Moscow Oblast, a village in Shemetovskoye Rural Settlement of Sergiyevo-Posadsky District of Moscow Oblast